The 1998 Cheltenham Council election took place on 7 May 1998 to elect members of Cheltenham Borough Council in Gloucestershire, England. One third of the council was up for election and the Liberal Democrats stayed in overall control of the council.

After the election, the composition of the council was
Liberal Democrat 27
Conservative 9
People Against Bureaucracy 4
Vacant 1

Campaign
Before the election the Liberal Democrats held 32 of the 41 seats on the council and were guaranteed to remain in control of the council with only 13 seats being contested. They were defending most of the seats up for election, while another 3 were held by the People Against Bureaucracy Action Group. These 3 seats included 2 where Liberal Democrats councillors had defected to People Against Bureaucracy. Meanwhile, the Liberal Democrat leader of the council, Alistair Cameron, stood down at the election.

The campaign saw the Conservatives attack the Liberal Democrats for the level of council tax in Cheltenham and for wasting money.

Election result

Ward results

References

1998 English local elections
1998
1990s in Gloucestershire